Fashion Film Festival Milano is an international fashion film festival and cultural event that takes place annually during Milan Fashion Week in Milan, Italy in collaboration with Camera Nazionale della Moda Italiana. Founded in 2014 by Constanza Cavalli Etro, Fashion Film Festival Milano presents fashion film as a cinematographic product realized by the fashion industry as a communication and marketing tool. Since 2017, Fashion Film Festival Milano takes place as a hybrid event with digital screenings and in-person events that introduce fashion film to a global audience.

The festival is a platform for both established and emerging directors. In line with the festival's philosophy “The Big helps the Small”, FFFMilano provides fertile ground for new talents by showing their works that alongside those of renowned authors.

In recent editions, the festival screened an official selection of about 260 fashion films from more than 60 countries during a six-day event that features an international jury, an award ceremony celebrating winners and nominees of 15 award categories, feature film premieres, conversations with personalities from the creative industry, fashion organizations, activists, film directors, photographers, celebrities and special projects.

In its conversations and feature films premieres, the festival has encouraged the discussion of social values and the awareness of issues such as women's empowerment, sustainability, diversity and the support of young talent.

There are no fees for the submission of films or the participation in screenings and special events.

Editions

8th edition, 14–18 January 2022 
The eighth edition of the Fashion Film Festival Milano took place as a hybrid event with a mainly digital format, an in-person film screening and exhibitions, concurrently with Men's Fashion Week in Milan and in collaboration with Camera Nazionale della Moda Italiana. The jury was chaired by Valentino's creative director Pierpaolo Piccioli and included the fashion designers Stella Jean and Harris Reed, actress Alba Rohrwacher, Chiara Sbarigia, president of Istituto Luce-Cinecittà, photographer Nadia Lee Cohen, model and activist Lea T and Laura Brown, editor in chief of InStyle Magazine.

The program of the eighth edition was curated by 260 fashion films in competition, selected from more than 1.000 entries from 60 countries. It included three conversations: one with the fashion designers and founders of WAMI ("We Are Made in Italy") Stella Jean, Edward Buchanan and Michelle Ngonomo about the inclusivity of African culture in the Italian fashion Industry. There was also a conversation “Women In Film” between the president of Cinecittà Chiara Sbarigia, the writer and director Lisa Immordino Vreeland, director Alessandra Cardone and the journalist and writer Marta Stella. The "FFFMilanoForGreen" initiative featured a talk between Fanny Moizant, founder of the vintage and designer clothing platform Vestiaire Collective; Sara Maino, Head of Vogue Talents; and sustainable fashion designer Matteo Ward about building a better industry and reducing fashion's environmental impact and waste.

The nominated and winning films were presented in a digital awards ceremony and were announced on the occasion of two contemporary exhibitions open to the public at Triennale di Milano and MIAC – Museo dell’Audiovisivo e del Cinema of Cinecittà in Rome, Italy. The eighth edition closed with a screening of the documentary “Elio Fiorucci: Free Spirit” at Triennale di Milano.

7th edition, 13–17 January 2021 
The seventh edition went online during five days of Men's Fashion Week and in collaboration with Camera della Moda Nazionale Italiana with a completely digital program. 200 fashion films, selected from 1000 entries from sixty countries, were presented in streaming on the festival's page on  the CNMI's the website and the festival's official homepage.

The jury was chaired by art director and Oscar-nominated costume designer Tim Yip and included Lachlan Watson, Marcelo Burlon, Anna dello Russo, Milovan Farronato, Margherita Missoni, Paolo Roversi, Eliza von Guttman and Tamu McPherson. The #FFFMilanoForGreen and #FFFMilanoForWomen initiatives set the tone for a total of six conversations centered on sustainability and women's rights, including a discussion with the collective Girls in Film, while two directors’ talk introduced the streaming of the feature films "Halston" by Frederic Cheng and "Martin Margiela; in his own words" by Reiner Holzheimer.

The conversation with Javier Goyeneche and the screening of the three feature films, "Made in Bangladesh", "Let it be Law" and "I am Greta" put the theme of sustainability at the center of the seventh edition.  At the digital awards ceremony "FFFMILANO Digital Awards", the nominated and awarded films were announced in video messages by the jurors, alternating with the messages of the winning directors, who received a digital version of the Fornasetti trophy.

6th edition, 6–10 November 2019 

The six edition inaugurated with the award ceremony Milan's Teatro dal Verme on November 6, 2019, and kicked off a five-day event from November 6–10. Inclusivity was the leading topic at this edition of the festival; several filmmakers explored the topic by questioning gender, race and disability. The contest featured 200 fashion films as the selection of 1000 entries from 50 countries, including films from Nigeria, China, Mexico, Finland and Iceland.

The jury was presided by fashion designer Giorgio Armani and included top model and human rights activist Waris Dirie, photographer Cass Bird, UNESCO ambassador for peace and sustainability and president of Instituto-E Oskar Mesavaht and curator Vicente Todolì. The edition featured the European and Italian premieres of “Peter Lindbergh: Women's Stories”, with an introduction by Paolo Roversi, Carla Sozzani and Alessia Glaviano and “The Times of Bill Cunningham”, introduced by director Mark Bozek.

The top model and founder of the Desert Flower Foundation Waris Dirie was appointed ambassador for the #FFFMilanoForWomen thematic section. Dirie held a conversation with actress and human rights activist Kiera Chaplin; followed by a talk between Mary Rozzi, founder of The September Issues magazine and Daria Bernardoni, editor-in-chief of the online magazine Freeda on “Independent Female Publishing”. The panel discussion “No Country for Women: How #GenerationEquality is breaking the rules within society” between Giorgia Roversi, Nicola Paòmarini and Francesca Vecchioni was accompanied by the film screening of “Fertility Day” by Sara Scamarcia and Paolo D’Orsogna.

The sixth edition in 2019 also featured the workshop "The Gaze of the Future Fashion Film Contest" in collaboration with Istituto Marangoni and with the participation of Constanza Cavalli Etro, Anna Dello Russo, Angelo Ruggeri and Andrea Pompilio as the jury, judging the 10 best videos produced by the students of Istituto Marangoni in Milan, Florence, London and Paris an awarding the film "In un mondo di etnie-chapter2" by Fabio Princigallo.

5th edition, 20–25 September 2018 
With six days, the fifth edition was the longest festival's manifestation. It took place at Anteo Palazzo del Cinema from September 20–24 and organized its program according to two initiatives: "FFFMilanoForWomen" to promote the female universe and "FFFMilanoForGreen" to foster the discussion about environmental pollution caused by the fashion industry and the integration of innovative solutions.

The official selection featured 200 films selected from a total of 800 films received from 50 countries. There was a conversation between the art curator Caroline Corbetta, film director Alina Marazzi and Vicky Lawton, and a talk between Orsola de Castro, Hakan Karaosman, Marina Spadafora and Matteo Ward which tackled the perspectives of sustainable fashion, while the screening of “Riverblue” shed a light on the devastating effects caused by the production of fashion items.

A screening and talk with the special project for Vogue Italia “Through My Eyes Ep. III – Roots” showcased the films of three emergent film directors Andrea Pecora, Papa Omotayo and  Eori Wakakuwa. There was a special screening of the film “We Margiela” and 500 VIP guests participated in the premiere of the documentary “McQueen”. The fifth edition closed with an award ceremony at Triennale di Milano. For the first time, the prize “Live the Moment Tribute” by Grey Goose was granted to director Virgilio Villoresi.

4th edition, 23–25 September 2017 
The fourth edition took off with Milan's Fashion Week from September 23 to 25 and featured the screening of 160 fashion films in official selection chosen out of more than 800 submitted films from 50 countries. The fourth edition established the initiative "FFFMilanoForWomen" to present a strong and successful female universe and inaugurated  with the premiere of the documentary "Franca: Chaos and Creation".

A conversation between Casey Legler, former Olympic swimmer and the first woman to have built a career as a men's clothes model and the president of the David di Donatello prize Piera Detassis. The collaboration with Vogue Italia renewned the project “Through my Eyes Ep. II – Women’s View” with a conversation moderated by Alessia Glaviano and Clara Del Nero that explored the experience of female directors in the film industry. The initiative gained momentum with a series of three screenings with films by female directors.

The off-contest included a masterclass “From fashion to cinema and from cinema to fashion” with the costume designer Daniela Ciancio. The festival premiered Spike Jonze’s and Natasha Lyonne’s fashion films for Kenzo next to films by Spike Lee, Lola Schnabel, Martin Scorsesee and Lisa Immordino Vreeland. The model and actress Elisa Sednaoui presented her debut film “In conversation with Vogue Arabia” for Elie Saab.

3rd edition, 24–26 September 2016 
The third edition ran from September 24 to 26 at Milan’s Anteo Spazio Cinema with the inaugural screening and Italian premiere of the documentary film "Anna Piaggi: A Visionary In Fashion" directed by Alina Marazzi. The edition attracted 750 submissions from 50 countries after a cut down to 180 films was made by the artistic committee. Together with Vogue Italia the festival presented “Through My Eyes”, a special project showing short films made by emergent directors.

The off-contest saw four conversations: "Women in Cinema," a talk between director Alina Marazzi and writer and journalist Marta Stella; "Digital Insiders" a discussion with Simon Bekerman,  Riccardo Conti, and Federico Sarica, founding editor of Rivista Studio; the conversation ”Fashion in Radio” between radio DJ La Pina and Nicoletta Morozzi; and a talk between founder of Purple Magazine, Olivier Zahm, and the curator Gloria Maria Cappelletti.

In collaboration with L'Archivio Nazionale Cinema d'Impresa the festival organized “Body&Garment”, a screening of experimental Italian films from the 60s and 70s directed by artists such as Bruno Munari, Ugo Nespolo and Mario Schifano. In collaboration with Discovery Channel the festival set up “FFFMilano Channel”, that ran from 10 September to 10 October 2016 as the first pop-up channel dedicated to fashion film. The third edition closed with an award ceremony at Triennale di Milano.

2nd Edition, 20–22 September 2015 
The second edition opened Milan's Fashion Week with a three-day event from September 20 to 22 in 2015 at Anteo Palazzo del Cinema. The number of films submitted doubled to 600 entries from 45 countries, from which the festival's curator Gloria Maria Cappelletti and the festival's artistic committee selected 180 films for the competition. The jury included Vogue Editor-in-chief Franca Sozzani, British photographer and founder of Hunger Magazine Rankin, French director Bruno Aveillan and U.S. writer and director Lisa Immordino Vreeland, to name a few.

Films were screened across four different theatre rooms inside of Cinema Anteo, showcasing exclusive unreleased content, 15-second short films, films in official selections. The fourth room was reserved for three conversation: A conversation between Modesta Dziautaite, Patrizia Morosa and Lisa Immordino Vreeland;  Alessia Glaviano, head of Global PhotoVogue interviewed Bruno Aveillan and the photographer Rankin. It also included a special screening on the occasion of Milano Film Festival that were held open-air at Parco Sempione and Triennale di Milano.

Starting with the second edition, the festival set up an online voting system that reported 3000 viewers who voted for the first time the winner of the “People’s Choice Award”. For its second edition, the festival signed a sponsorship with Mercedes-Benz and won Paramount Pictures and MTV Italia as its media partner. Following the event, the festival was included in the exhibition “A-Z. Il nuovo vocabolario della moda italiana” at Triennale di Milano.

1st Edition, 14–15 September 2014 
The first edition was launched in collaboration with the Italian Fashion Council, Camera Nazionale della Moda Italiana, and anticipated the Fashion Week in Milan with a two-day event from September 14–15, 2014. The jury was presided by Vogue Italia Editor-in-chief Franca Sozzani and included Oscar-winning film director Luca Guadagnino, Claudia Donaldson, Editor-in-chief of the video channel NOWNESS and fashion journalist Tim Blanks. In its first year, the festival awarded 14 categories: Standouts were Wes Andersons’ fashion film “Castello Cavalcanti” for Prada and Paolo Sorrentino’s short movies series “Frames of Life” conceived for Armani. The emerging designer Rie Yamagata won three categories.  The first edition presented 80 fashion films selected from 350 films submitted from 34 countries. It saw the participation of more than 4000 spectators.

Awards 
For every edition, Italian artist Fornasetti exclusively designs the trophies for Fashion Film Festival Milano. The festival organizes the competition in two categories “New Talents” and “Established Talents”, following the main principle to mutually support renowned and upcoming talents.

The current award categories are:

 Best Fashion Film
 Best Director
 Best Italian Fashion Film
 Best Experimental Fashion Film
 Best Documentary
 Best Styling
 Best Editing
 Best Music
 Best Photography
 Best Green Fashion Film
 Best New Fashion Film
 Best New Director
 Best New Italian Fashion Film
 Best New Designer/Brand  
 People's Choice Award

International Jury 
Members to Fashion Film Festival Milano's international jury have included Oscar-winning film directors, renowned fashion designers, photographers and personalities from cultural industries spanning fashion, cinema, art and culture:

2022 

 Pierpaolo Piccioli (President of FFM 2022 jury), Creative Director Maison Valentino
 Alba Rohrwacher, actress
 Laura Brown, Editor-in-chief Instyle Magazine
 Harris Reed, fashion designer
 Vincent Peters, photographer
 Chiara Sbarigia, President of Cinecittà
 Piero Piazzi, President of Women Management
 Nadia Lee Cohen, photographer and director
 Esteban Diacono, digital artist
 Lea T, top model and activist
 Stella Jean, fashion designer
 Arturo Galansino, Director Palazzo Strozzi
 Fanny Moizant, Founder of Vestiaire Collective
 Kerry Bannigan, Director Fashion Impact Fund

2021 

 Tim Yip (President of FFFM 2021 jury), art director and Oscar-winning costume designer
 Lachlan Watson, actress
 Marcelo Burlon, Creative director
 Anna Dello Russo, journalist and influencer
 Milovan Farronato, curator
 Javier Goyeneche, Founder Ecoalf
 Margherita Missoni, fashion designer
 Paolo Roversi, photographer
 Elizabeth Von Guttman, Founder System Magazine
 Tamu McPherson, influencer

2019 

 Giorgio Armani (President of FFFM 2019 jury), fashion designer 
 Waris Dirie, top model and activist
 Ezra Petronio, Founder Selfservice Magazine
 Oskar Metsavaht, Founder and designer of Osklen
 Vicente Todolì, Artistic Director Hangar Bicocca
 Cristina Capotondi, actress
 Sissy Vian, stylist
 Cass Bird, photographer
 Angelo Flaccavento, fashion journalist

2018 

 Anna Lily Amirpour, director
 Max Vadukul, photographer
 Caroline Corbetta, contemporary art curator
 Orsola de Castro, Founder Fashion Revolution
 Umit Benan, fashion designer
 Piera Detassis, journalist, essayist and film critic
 Nicoletta Santoro, stylist and creative director
 Pablo Arroyo, photographer and creative director
 Taz Vega, actress
 Bianca Balti, top model

2017 

 Ilaria Bonacossa, Director MAAD, art historian and curator
 Carlo Capasa, President Camera Nazionale della Moda Italiana
 Eva Riccobono, model and actress
 Jim Nelson, journalist, former editor-in-chief GQ
 Federico Pepe, artist, graphic designer, publisher
 Sølve Sundsbø, fashion photographer and filmmaker
 Maria Luisa Frisa, art critic, fashion curator and Director of the degree course in Fashion Design and Multimedia Arts at Università Iuav di Venezia

2016 

 Franca Sozzani (President of FFM 2016 jury), former Editor-in-chief Vogue Italia
 Claudia Llosa, director, winner of Golden Bear and Oscar nominee
 Michelangelo Di Battista, photographer and director
 Andrea Lissoni, Artistic director Haus der Kunst and curator
 Olivier Zaham, Founder Purple Magazine, photographer and director
 Miroslava Duma, digital entrepreneur
 Enrico Dorizza, entrepreneur
 Emanuela Martini, film critic

2015 

 Franca Sozzani (President of FFM 2015 jury), former Editor-in-chief Vogue Italia
 Bruno Aveillan, filmmaker, photographer and contemporary artist.
 Lisa Immordino Vreeland, writer and director
 Rankin, photographer and director
 Mario Codognato, curator of contemporary art
 Sara Maino, Head of Special Projects Vogue Italia

2014 

 Franca Sozzani (President of FFM 2014 jury), former Editor-in-chief Vogue Italia
 Luca Guadagnino, film director, producer, screenwriter.
 Jane Reeve, former CEO Camera Nazionale della Moda Italiana
 Claudia Donaldson, former Editor-in-chief NOWNESS
 Tim Blanks, Editor-at-large Business of Fashion

Winning Films

2022

2021

2019

2018

2017

2016

2015

2014

Feature films 
The festival's official program shows the best features films dedicated to honor important figures in the fashion industry and promote awareness of societal topics such as sustainability ("FFFMilanoForGreen"), women empowerment ("FFFMilanoForWomen") and young talents ("FFFMilanoForYoung"). Past editions have screened the Milanese, Italian or European premiere of documentaries.

Structure 
The festival is directed by Constanza Cavalli Etro. She is married to the Italian fashion designer Kean Etro, whom she followed to live in Milan, Italy, where she founded Fashion Film Festival Milano. Born in Argentina, she started her professional career in Mexico, where she founded the production and public relations agency CavalliCommunicacion and co-founded Mexico's Fashion Week.

Cavalli Etro was among the organizers of the first film festival in Argentina ("Festival Argentino de Cine) and in 2022 she co-founded "LAFA", the first Fashion Awards in Latin America.

Constanza Cavalli Etro appeared in Sheikha Intisar AlSabah's book "Circle of Love" (2019) as one of the women who are changing the international fashion and cultural scene. Forbes Italy named her as one of the 100 Successful Women of 2020 in Italy.

External links
  Official web site

References

Italian fashion
Fashion events in Italy
Film festivals in Italy
Annual events in Milan
Fashion festivals
Arts festivals in Italy